Scott Lipsky and Rajeev Ram were the defending champions but decided not to participate.
Colin Fleming and Ross Hutchins defeated Michal Mertiňák and André Sá 2–6, 7–6(7–5), [15–13] in the final to win the title.

Seeds

Draw

Draw

References
 Main draw

Delray Beach International Tennis Championships - Doubles
2012 Doubles
Delray Beach International Tennis Championships - Doubles
2012 Delray Beach International Tennis Championships